Lucky Strike is an American brand of cigarettes owned by the British American Tobacco group. Individual cigarettes of the brand are often referred to colloquially as "Luckies."

Name 
Lucky Strike was introduced as a brand of chewing tobacco by American firm R.A. Patterson in 1871, and evolved into a cigarette by the early 1900s. The brand name was inspired by the gold rushes of the era, during which only about four miners in a thousand were fortunate enough to strike gold, and was intended to connote a top-quality blend.

A well-circulated urban legend holds that the name "Lucky Strike" referred to the presence of marijuana in some cigarette packs.

History 
The brand was first introduced by R. A. Patterson of Richmond, Virginia, in 1871 as cut plug and later a cigarette. In 1905, the company was acquired by the American Tobacco Company (ATC).

In 1917, the brand debuted the slogan "It's Toasted" to tout the manufacturing method of toasting, rather than sun drying, the tobacco, a process claimed to improve the flavor of the product.  In an attempt to counter that popular campaign, competitor Camel went in the other direction, claiming that Camel was a "fresh" cigarette "never parched or toasted."

In the late 1920s, the brand was sold as a route to thinness for women. One typical ad said, "Reach for a Lucky instead of a sweet." Sales of Lucky Strikes increased by more than 300% during the first year of the advertising campaign. In the early 1930s, Al Jolson was also paid to endorse the brand; he called Lucky Strike "the cigarette of the acting profession...the good old flavor of Luckies is as sweet and soothing as the best 'Mammy' song ever written." Sales went from 14 billion cigarettes in 1925 to 40 billion in 1930, making Lucky Strike the leading brand nationwide.

Lucky Strike's association with radio music programs began during the 1920s on NBC. By 1928, the bandleader and vaudeville producer B. A. Rolfe was performing on radio and recording as "B.A. Rolfe and his Lucky Strike Orchestra" for Edison Records. In 1935, ATC began to sponsor Your Hit Parade, featuring North Carolina tobacco auctioneer Lee Aubrey "Speed" Riggs (later, another tobacco auctioneer from Lexington, Kentucky, F.E. Boone, was added). The weekly radio show's countdown catapulted the brand's success, remaining popular for 25 years. The shows capitalized on the tobacco auction theme and each ended with the signature phrase "Sold, American".

In 1934, Edward Bernays was asked to deal with women's apparent reluctance to buy Lucky Strikes because their green and red package clashed with standard female fashions. When Bernays suggested changing the package to a neutral color,  George Washington Hill, head of the American Tobacco Company, refused, saying that he had already spent millions advertising the package. Bernays then endeavored to make green a fashionable color. The centerpiece of his efforts was the Green Ball, a social event at the Waldorf Astoria, hosted by Narcissa Cox Vanderlip. The pretext for the ball and its unnamed underwriter was that proceeds would go to charity. Famous society women would attend wearing green dresses. Manufacturers and retailers of clothing and accessories were advised of the excitement growing around the color green. Intellectuals were enlisted to give highbrow talks on the theme of green. Before the ball had actually taken place, newspapers and magazines (encouraged in various ways by Bernays's office) had latched on to the idea that green was all the rage.

The company's advertising campaigns generally featured a theme that stressed the quality of the tobacco purchased at auction for use in making Lucky Strike cigarettes and claimed that the higher quality tobacco resulted in a cigarette with better flavor. American engaged in a series of advertisements using Hollywood actors as endorsers of Lucky Strike, including testimonials from Douglas Fairbanks, concerning the cigarette's flavor, often described as delicious due to the tobacco being toasted. In 1937–38, American Tobacco paid $130,000 ($3.2 million in 2019 USD) to 16 Hollywood actors and actresses for their endorsement of Lucky Strike, the highest paid being Joan Crawford, Gary Cooper, Clark Gable, Myrna Loy, Robert Taylor, and Spencer Tracy who were each paid $10,000 (roughly $178,000 in 2019 USD). "Luckies" were the cigarette of choice for the famous smoker Bette Davis, who smoked them until the final years of her life (The New York Times noted the year of her death that she had switched them for Vantage filtered cigarettes).

Beginning in the fall of 1944, Lucky Strike was also a sponsor of comedian Jack Benny's radio and TV show, The Jack Benny Program, which was also introduced as The Lucky Strike Program.

The brand's signature dark-green pack was changed to white in 1942. In a famous advertising campaign that used the slogan "Lucky Strike Green has gone to war", the company claimed the change was made because the copper used in the green color was needed for World War II. American Tobacco actually used chromium to produce the green ink, and copper to produce the gold-colored trim. A limited supply of each was available, and substitute materials made the package look drab.

The white package actually was introduced to modernize the label and to increase the appeal of the package among female smokers; market studies showed that the green package was not found attractive by women, who had become important consumers of tobacco products. The war effort became a convenient way to make the product more marketable while appearing patriotic at the same time.

Famed industrial designer Raymond Loewy was challenged by company president George Washington Hill to improve the existing green and red package, with a $50,000 bet at stake. Loewy changed the background from green to white, making it more attractive to women, as well as cutting printing costs by eliminating the need for green dye. He also placed the Lucky Strike target logo on both sides of the package, a move that increased both visibility and sales. Hill paid off the bet.

The message "L.S./M.F.T." ("Lucky Strike means fine tobacco") was introduced on the package in 1944.

Lucky Strike was one of the brands included in the C-rations provided to US combat troops during the Second World War. Each C ration of the time included, among other items, nine cigarettes of varying brands because at the time, top military brass would declare that tobacco was essential to the morale of soldiers fighting on the front lines. The other cigarette brands included in the C-rations were Camel, Chelsea, Chesterfield, Craven "A"-Brand, Old Gold, Philip Morris, Player's, Raleigh, and Wings. The practice of including cigarettes in field rations continued during the Korean and Vietnam Wars, ending around 1975 or 1976 with the growing knowledge that smoking caused various kinds of health problems.

Post World War II 
In 1978 and 1994, export and US rights were purchased by Brown & Williamson. In the 1960s, filtered styles were launched in addition to a mentholated version called "Lucky Strike Green". This time "Green" was referring to menthol and not to the overall package color. In late 2006, both the Full Flavored and Light filtered varieties of Lucky Strike cigarettes were discontinued in North America. However, Lucky Strike continued to have marketing and distribution support in territories controlled by BAT as a global brand. In addition, R. J. Reynolds continues to market the original, nonfilter Lucky Strikes in the United States. Lucky Strike currently has a small base of smokers.

In 2007, a new packaging of Lucky Strikes was released, with a two-way opening which split seven cigarettes from the rest. In the same year, the company used the world's smallest man, He Pingping, in their ad campaigns.

In 2009, Lucky Strike Silver (the brand marketed as lighter) changed their UK packs from the quintessential red design to blue, albeit with a red teaser outer covering the packet.

In 2012 consumption of Lucky Strikes stood at 33 billion packets, up from 23 billion in 2007. The television series Mad Men, which featured Lucky Strike as a major client of the advertising firm Sterling Cooper and the cigarette of choice of Don Draper, was credited with inspiring the massive jump in sales.

In December 2020, Lucky Strike filtered cigarettes, both full-flavored and lights, plus full-flavored and light menthol versions, were reintroduced to the US market.

Sport sponsorship

From 1972 until the team's departure in 1975, Lucky Strike sponsored the Scuderia Scribante team, which were also known as "Neville Lederle" and "Lucky Strike Racing". The cars, driven by Neville Lederle and Dave Charlton, were some of the first to be sponsored by a major tobacco company after the Lotus Team got sponsored by Gold Leaf in 1968, and Marlboro started sponsoring British Racing Motors in 1972 and later McLaren in 1974. The team mainly participated in the South African Grand Prix in Kyalami, but during the 1972 Formula One season, the team also participated in the French Grand Prix in Circuit de Charade, the British Grand Prix in Brands Hatch and the German Grand Prix at the old Nürburgring. After the retirement of the team, it would take more than 20 years before Lucky Strike would participate in Formula 1 again with the British American Racing team.

As a result of British American Tobacco (BAT) buying out American Tobacco Company in 1976, Lucky Strike came under control of BAT. The company acquired Formula 1's Tyrrell Racing team in 1997 and rebranded it as British American Racing the following year, sponsoring the team with its Lucky Strike and stablemate 555 brands. In the team's début season, they originally wanted to brand Jacques Villeneuve's car in the red and white Lucky Strike livery, while branding Ricardo Zonta's car with the blue colours of 555. However, the FIA blocked the move, and the team were forced to run two similar liveries. They opted to have the Lucky Strike livery on the left hand side of the car and the 555 livery on the right hand side, with a zip going up in the middle of the nose. From 2000 on, the team solely used Lucky Strike branding. The team was bought outright by partners Honda by 2006, though Lucky Strike continued to sponsor the team until the end of that year. For races where tobacco branding wasn't allowed, the Lucky Strike logo was blocked out (from 1999 to 2004), replaced by "Run Free" on other parts of the car (in 1999), changed to "Look Alike" (from 2000 to 2003), to a barcode with Formula One cars (in 2003–2004), to "Look Left", "Look Right", and "Don't Walk" (in 2004), and "Racing Revolution" (in 2005–2006).

Lucky Strike was also the prime sponsor of the Suzuki MotoGP team from the 1990 season until the 1997 season. American motorcycle racer Kevin Schwantz became the 1993 world champion riding the Lucky Strike sponsored Suzuki RGV500, with riders such as Doug Chandler, Alex Barros and Daryl Beattie taking various podiums and wins on the Lucky Strike Suzuki as well.

In popular culture

In art 
 American Colonial-Cubist artist Stuart Davis represented the brand in his 1921 painting, Lucky Strike.

In music 

 The song "Give it Back to the Indians" composed by Rodgers and Hart from the 1939 musical Too Many Girls, contains a reference to Lucky Strikes.
 The song "So Round, So Firm, So Fully Packed", written by Merle Travis, Eddie Kirk, and Cliffie Stone in 1947, is named for a Lucky Strike advertising slogan.
The song “Hero In Your Own Hometown” by Mary Chapin Carpenter references “Luckys”
The song "I'm Bad, I'm Nationwide" performed by ZZ Top from their 1979 album Degüello, contains a reference to Lucky Strikes.
The song "Keeping the Faith" performed by Billy Joel from his 1983 album An Innocent Man, contains a reference to Lucky Strikes.
The song "Chain Smokin'" performed by Morgan Wallen, contains a reference to Lucky Strikes.
The song “These are My People” performed by Rodney Atkins, references smoking Lucky Strikes.
 Minneapolis indie rock band Howler based the artwork of their debut album America Give Up on a pack of Lucky Strikes.
A song named after the cigarettes appears on the Maroon 5 album, Overexposed.
A song named after the cigarettes appears on the Troye Sivan album, Bloom.
The song "Then Came the Night" performed by Tommy Shane Steiner a cover of the same song by Trace Adkins mentions a Lucky Strike cigarette.
The song "Back in this Cigarette" by Jason Aldean references an ashtray full of Lucky Strikes.
Paul Silhan recorded a parody of Lou Christie's hit song "Lightnin' Strikes" - titled "Lightin' Up Lucky Strikes Again" for his 1997 album Spinball Wizard. It was frequently played around that time on The Rush Limbaugh Show.
The song "Everything Must Go" performed by Steely Dan from their eponymous 2003 album, contains a reference to Lucky Strikes.

In film 
 In Breathless a young girl (played by Liliane Dreyfus) standing in front of a wall decoration made of empty boxes of Gauloises lights a cigarette and claims that she switched to Luckies.
 In the seminal Eddie Murphy film Beverly Hills Cop (1984) his character Axel Foley is introduced as a jive talking hustler involved in the clandestine sale of illegally procured semi truck full of Lucky Strike cigarettes.
 In the 1990 film Misery famed novelist Paul Sheldon played by James Caan has a habit of smoking a single Lucky Strike cigarette and drinking a glass of Dom Pérignon always when he's about to finish the manuscript for a new novel.
In the opening song to the 2001 film Cowboy Bebop: The Movie a pack of original red Lucky Strikes appears on a table.
 In the 1999 film The Thirteenth Floor a Lucky Strikes billboard can be seen on a highway.
 In the 1999 film The Ninth Gate Johnny Depp's character Dean Corso, smokes Lucky Strikes cigarettes.
 In the 1994 movie The Shawshank Redemption Lucky Strike cigarettes are frequently exchanged between prisoners. 
 In the 1990 movie Goodfellas, Henry and Tommy are seen selling cartons of cigarettes on the street and boxes with Lucky Strike logos can be seen inside of a truck.
 In the 1987 movie The Untouchables, Eliot Ness (Kevin Costner) smokes Lucky Strike cigarettes.
 In the 1982 film The Year of Living Dangerously, correspondent Guy Hamilton (Mel Gibson) smokes Lucky Strike cigarettes, which the Indonesian locals seem to regard as being superior to their domestic brands.

In television 
 In the AMC television series Mad Men, Lucky Strike is a major client for the fictional advertising agency Sterling Cooper. A fictitious plot is also presented for the birth of the slogan "It's Toasted", in the series' pilot episode, "Smoke Gets in Your Eyes". The main character, Don Draper, is often seen smoking Lucky Strikes.
 In the NBC television series Miami Vice, Lucky Strike is the preferred cigarette brand of main character, Detective James "Sonny" Crockett. He is even seen removing the filter of a different brand of cigarette in a particular episode to make it smoke more like a Lucky Strike.
 Sergeant Donald Malarkey, in the HBO television series Band of Brothers, episode 6, shares cigarettes with Sgt. Warren “Skip” Muck, and Private First Class Alex Penkala in a foxhole during a Christmas break from fighting. He recites the advertising slogan, “Lucky Strikes means fine tobacco,” as he distributes them. Lucky Strike cigarettes are featured prominently throughout the series.
 In the HBO mini-series, The Pacific, Lucky Strike cigarettes are prominently featured throughout the program.

In literature 

 The poem "At the Fishhouses", by Elizabeth Bishop, from her 1956 collection A Cold Spring, contains a reference to Lucky Strikes: "The old man accepts a Lucky Strike, / He was a friend of my grandfather."

In video games 
In the Metal Gear videogame series, Lucky Strike is Solid Snake's favorite brand of cigarettes.

Manga 

 In the manga Last Inning by Ryu Kamio, the protagonist, Keisuke Hatogaya, consumes these cigarettes, the first direct reference being chapter 4 of the first volume.

Cigarette camp
"Lucky Strike" was the name of one of a number of temporary U.S. Army "tent cities" known as Cigarette Camps situated around the French port of Le Havre following its capture in the wake of the Allied D-Day invasion in mid-1944.

See also 
 Tobacco smoking

References

External links 

 Collection of mid-twentieth century advertising featuring Lucky Strike cigarettes from The TJS Labs Gallery of Graphic Design.
 "Lucky Strikes?" by Barbara Mikelson at snopes.com (June 12, 2006)

R. J. Reynolds Tobacco Company brands
British American Tobacco brands
1871 introductions
L
Cigarette brands